Catherine Ann "Katy" Manning (born 14 October 1946) is an English-Australian actress, television presenter, voice artist and former model. Although she has made many appearances on both screen and stage, Manning is best known for her part as the companion Jo Grant in the BBC science fiction television series Doctor Who. Manning initially played the role regularly from 1971 to 1973 but also reprised the role in the Doctor Who spin-off The Sarah Jane Adventures in 2010. She is also well known for voicing Iris Wildthyme in the audio series Iris Wildthyme for Big Finish Productions since 2005.

Moving to Australia in 1982, Manning continued her career before moving to Los Angeles, U.S. in the 1990s and then returning to Australia. She has also made many theatre appearances, including two one-woman shows and playing Mary Smith in the first run of the play Run for Your Wife and Rita in Educating Rita at the Sydney Opera House.

Since 1990, Manning has been in a relationship with Australian entertainer and singer Barry Crocker and is now an Australian citizen. In 2009, Manning moved back to the U.K. to pursue new acting work and currently lives in London.

Early life
Manning was born in Guildford, Surrey, the younger daughter of politician turned sports columnist J. L. Manning OBE and Amy Manning (née Jenkins); her elder sister Jane Dressler (née Manning) moved to New York City, U.S. and became a fashion model for Eileen Ford. Manning spent her early years in Dulwich Village. Due to Manning being severely myopic, teachers failed to understand her condition and she was teased by the other children for having poor eyesight and wearing large glasses. Manning then attended Miss Dixon and Miss Wolfe's School for Girls where she became best friends with classmate Liza Minnelli, daughter of Judy Garland, and spent a lot of time at Garland and Sidney Luft's home in Chelsea. Manning socialised with stars such as James Mason and Dirk Bogarde, and had tea with Noël Coward at The Savoy. As a teenager, Manning became a model for Biba.

Aged sixteen, Manning was involved in a horrific car crash after the driver, her boyfriend Brian Gascoigne (brother of Bamber Gascoigne), fell asleep at the wheel.  The car, which had no seatbelts, careered over a roundabout and crashed into a garage. Manning was thrown through the windscreen and through a plate glass window ending up on the bonnet of the car, leaving back and both her legs broken and her face disfigured. It took nine policemen to retrieve Manning from the wreckage and she later said of her injuries that her "eye and mouth on one side of her face sort of met". Manning was taken to hospital in the police car as they thought she would not survive the time for an ambulance to arrive.  She had to spend nearly two years recovering in hospital and had to have her head shaved and several skin grafts on her face, as well as reconstructive surgery at Queen Victoria Hospital in East Grinstead. Manning suffered an embolism and had to have both her legs pinned which put an end to her dreams of becoming a dancer.

Manning went to the U.S. to stay with her sister to recover, and was  offered a five-year contract with MGM by Arthur Mayer at one of her sister's house parties, although she turned it down in fear of not doing a film in her contract. Inspired by this, upon her return to the UK, Manning trained at the Webber Douglas Academy of Dramatic Art, and then joined a Wolverhampton repertory company. Her first screen credit was in an egg commercial which also starred Jacqueline Bisset. Manning then made her TV debut in the BBC drama Softly, Softly: Taskforce, in the episode 'Standing Orders'. Shortly after, she was seen in two episodes playing Julia Dungarvon in ITV's Man At The Top. Manning was originally given the small role of a French au-pair girl for one episode, however during filming the producers, impressed with Manning's performance, instead gave her a larger role in two episodes.

Career

Doctor Who
She played the part of Jo Grant from 1971 to 1973 alongside Jon Pertwee's incarnation of the Doctor. Manning struck up an immediate rapport with her co-stars Pertwee, Nicholas Courtney (The Brigadier), John Levene (Sergeant Benton), Richard Franklin (Captain Mike Yates) and Roger Delgado (the Master). Fans of Doctor Who often refer to these characters as the UNIT family — UNIT, the United Nations Intelligence Taskforce, being the fictional United Nations organisation that the Doctor worked for. Manning is the only surviving companion from Pertwee's era.

Making her debut in the episode Terror of the Autons, the character of Jo Grant instantly became liked by audiences to the extent that she is often thought of as the archetypal companion along with Sarah Jane Smith and Rose Tyler. Manning said of her performance: "The little kiddies really got me. Older men found it quite pleasant to look at me. The mothers and girls didn’t feel threatened and loved Jo’s trendy clothes and rings". Patrick Mulkern of the Radio Times said of Manning's portrayal that "she had it all: innocence and gumption, courage and a terrific scream, an irresistible bubbly mixture of tomboy and sexpot." Unlike other companions, Jo wore clothes that were in fashion at the time including go-go boots and miniskirts although the latter had an occasional tendency to show Manning's underwear.  In an interview with Radio Times in 1972, Manning said she wore her own clothes when playing Jo.
 
Manning had a particularly close relationship with Pertwee to the extent that he would pick Manning up every day from outside her house, either in his car or on his motorbike where Manning would ride pillion, and take her for filming or rehearsals for Doctor Who. They had races with Dick Emery and Sir Ralph Richardson to see who could get to the BBC studios first. Manning would also spend time at Pertwee's villa in Ibiza with Pertwee and his family.

After three years in Doctor Who, Manning decided to leave the show to move on to other acting work. Pertwee was reportedly very sad at her departure due to their close working relationship and cited Manning leaving and the death of Delgado as two major reasons why he left the show a year later. In Manning's exit in The Green Death, she leaves the Doctor to marry Professor Clifford Jones (Stewart Bevan); Mark Harrison of Den of Geek named it "a bittersweet exit for one of the most popular companions."

Manning's connection with Doctor Who continues: she voices Jo Grant in the audio adventures by Big Finish Productions, and she is also the voice of the Time Lord Iris Wildthyme in several of the Big Finish Productions audio plays. She has also contributed to a large number of documentaries and DVD commentaries detailing her time on Doctor Who.

She is also involved with fan events and conventions, and she is the patron of the Doctor Who Club of Australia.

In 2022, Manning made a cameo appearance as Jo Grant in the Doctor Who special "The Power of the Doctor".

After Doctor Who
Straight after leaving Doctor Who in 1973, Manning presented her own ten-part TV series for the BBC on crafts, entitled Serendipity shown in the daytime schedules. She then appeared as one of the first lesbians on television in an episode of Armchair Theatre before starring in her first film Don't Just Lie There, Say Something! (1974) alongside Leslie Phillips, Joan Sims and Joanna Lumley; the film was written by Pertwee's brother Michael. Manning followed this with a role in the comedy film Eskimo Nell (1975) as Rosalind Knight's rebellious daughter before she was reunited with Jon Pertwee when she appeared in Whodunnit? on ITV; at the time that Pertwee was chairing the panel. In 1976, Manning aroused controversy when she posed nude with a Dalek for the Girl Illustrated magazine. She responded to critics by saying "you'd need a magnifying glass to see anything". In 1977, she appeared topless as a drug addict in the hard-hitting crime drama Target with Patrick Mower.  Manning starred with Sion Probert in a BBC Wales comedy pilot entitled How's Business? in 1979.

After leaving Doctor Who, Manning appeared predominantly on stage consistently. From 1973 to 1975, she appeared opposite Derek Nimmo in Why Not Stay For Breakfast? in the West End, as well as appearing in There's a Girl in My Soup with Gerald Flood. She then starred in the play French Without Tears in 1975 and So Who Needs Men with Peter Denyer and Jeff Rawle in 1976 before joining the Young Vic for a time in 1977 and taking part in many of Shakespeare's works including playing Ophelia in Hamlet. From 1977 to 1978, she toured in Doctor in the House, a production that also starred Jimmy Edwards, Bob Grant and future Doctor Who actor Colin Baker, before starring as Myra alongside Lionel Blair in The Monkey Walk in 1978. In 1978, she toured Rhodesia in a run of Bedroom Farce. From 1979 to 1980, Manning toured in the thriller play The Gentle Hook, then in 1980 toured in Peter Terson's VE Night alongside Ian Cullen and Jane Goddard before appearing on stage in Thark  alongside Brian Murphy and Reginald Marsh in 1981.

Australia and the U.S.
After moving to Australia in 1982, she appeared as Mary Smith in the first run of the play Run for Your Wife with Bernard Cribbins before appearing in Otherwise Engaged opposite Martin Shaw in 1983, The Odd Couple with Jack Klugman in 1984 and then in another tour of Run for Your Wife from 1987 to 1988; other members of the cast in the production were Jack Smethurst, David McCallum and Eric Sykes. Manning appeared as Rita in Educating Rita from 1989 to 1991 at the Sydney Opera House, the venue at which she also played Elvira in Blithe Spirit in 1990. She also appeared in the films Melvin, Son of Alvin (1984) and Frog Dreaming (1986).

Manning wrote a comedy pilot entitled Two in the Bush in 1986 with her friend and fellow actress Penelope Whiteley. Manning also wrote the TV series Private Wives and has been involved in other writing and directing projects. Manning was also offered a role in popular Australian soap Home and Away but she had  to turn it down due to busy work commitments. In 1993, Manning was reunited with Jon Pertwee and Nicholas Courtney for the first time since she emigrated to Australia at the PanoptiCon 93 event; their interview was filmed and released on DVD.

Some time between 1994 and 1996, Manning moved to live in Los Angeles where she shared a flat with her best friend Liza Minnelli and had large house parties that had guests including Sean Penn, Shirley MacLaine and Whoopi Goldberg. In 1996, Manning and Minnelli appeared drunk on Ruby Wax's television series Ruby Wax Meets... which has since gone on to become one of the most popular and well-known moments in the show's history. Wax's interview was initially to be with Minnelli but Manning appeared with her and spent most of the interview on the floor.

While living in the U.S., Manning and Minnelli started up a production company. It was living in L.A. that Manning started writing her first one-woman show called Not a Well Woman in which she portrays twenty-six characters all with different voices and some scenes depict several of these characters interacting with each other. Not a Well Womans opening performance was in New York and Minnelli invited some top producers to watch the premiere including Blake Edwards. After the show, Edwards personally complimented Manning on her performance calling it "extraordinary". The show was only limited to a few shows as it started to take its toll on Manning. She later recorded an audio version of Not a Well Woman for Big Finish Productions in 2011, as part of their Drama Showcase anthology series.

By 1998, Manning had returned to Australia where she appeared as Dotty in a production of Noises Off before making a documentary for Reeltime Pictures called Where on Earth is Katy Manning? which is shown in a day-by-day format showing Manning's time attending various fan conventions on a trip to the U.K. Manning was the voice of Australia's UKTV television channel in the late 1990s and provided voiceovers for the indents. She also hosted her own chat show from 2001 until 2008 called Preview with Katy Manning and had guests including Lenny Henry, Edgar Wright, Petula Clark and Basil Brush.

Manning also voiced characters for the animated films D4: The Trojan Dog (1999), Easter in Bunnyland (2000) and Jungle Girl and the Lost Island of Dinosaurs (2002) for Burbank Animation Studios. From 2000 to 2001, she voiced the main character Gloria in the Australian children's animated television series Gloria's House, amongst countless other animated films and television series. In 2002, Manning appeared in an episode of All Saints and also starred in a production of the Ray Cooney play It Runs in the Family with Robert Coleby and Judy Cornwell. Also in 2002, she released another documentary about her life for Reeltime Pictures as a sequel to Where on Earth is Katy Manning? called Katy Manning's Life Down Under showing her life in Australia. In 2003, Manning directed the original run of the musical play Eureka as well as other productions including Banjo Paterson and Shirley Valentine.

She also starred as Miss Harrington in the film noir When Darkness Falls (2006) directed by Australian filmmaker Rohan Spong; a role for which she would win Best Supporting Actress at the Melbourne Underground Film Festival. In June and July 2007, she appeared as Yvette in the stage show 'Allo 'Allo! alongside Gorden Kaye as René Artois at Twelfth Night Theatre in Brisbane as original actress Vicki Michelle was unavailable. Guy Siner and Sue Hodge also reprised their original roles from the television series, and the other characters were portrayed by Australian television actors including Steven Tandy and Jason Gann.

In 2009, Manning returned to the UK as part of her one-woman show Me and Jezebel. The play was based on a true 1985 story about Bette Davis inviting herself to a fan's house for a night and staying for a month, with Manning playing all the parts. It toured through March and April in England and also played at the 2009 Edinburgh Fringe at The Gilded Balloon Wine Bar in August. The show received a five-star review in the Edinburgh Evening News, which described Manning as "one of Britain's best actresses". Manning also received two other four-star reviews and appeared on STV news promoting the show.

Return to the UK
Manning moved back to live in the UK in 2009. In October 2010, Manning reprised her role as Jo Jones (née Grant) in the fourth series of the Doctor Who spin-off The Sarah Jane Adventures with Matt Smith as the Eleventh Doctor. The two-part story, entitled 'Death of the Doctor', was written by former executive producer of the programme Russell T Davies. She meets the Doctor again, and stars with her grandson Santiago Jones. In 2011, Manning appeared as Blodwyn Morgan, a Welsh busybody and clairvoyant, in the touring stage play Death by Fatal Murder.  This was a Peter Gordon play, and part of the Inspector Pratt trilogy. Manning, among many other well-known actors, had a cameo in the comedy film Run for Your Wife in 2012. In November 2013 she appeared as a fictionalised version of herself in the Doctor Who one-off 50th anniversary comedy homage The Five(ish) Doctors Reboot.

Manning returned to the Edinburgh Fringe in 2014 in the play 'Keeping up with the Joans' with Susan Penhaligon. The play also toured to The Customs House, South Shields & Greenwich Theatre London. She also appeared as Susan Payne in the 2014 supernatural gangster film Evil Never Dies (originally titled The Haunting of Harry Payne) starring Tony Scannell and Graham Cole. In 2015, Manning appeared in an episode of Casualty. From 2016 to 2017, Manning played Suzy alongside Tom Baker in the audio sitcom Baker's End about life in a fictional rural village. She also starred in the short films Memoria (2017) and The Power of One Coin and  provided her voice for two Doctor Who video games.

In both 2019 and 2020, Manning reprised her role of Jo Jones for two specially filmed scenes to promote two Doctor Who blu-ray box sets. She also starred in a special episode to mark the conclusion of The Sarah Jane Adventures, released via YouTube in 2020 on the anniversary of Elisabeth Sladen's death.

Personal life 
Manning was born with myopia, commonly known as nearsightedness or shortsightedness, which caused numerous injuries during the filming of Doctor Who. She has stated, "Once I tried to take the wrong children home from school!"

Manning dated Jimi Hendrix in the 1960s. She also dated Richard Eyre, David Troughton, Derek Fowlds, Stewart Bevan and Rod Stewart’s keyboard player Peter Bardens. Manning once told of how she was dropped off for her first day at drama school in a black Cadillac with her boyfriend Bardens and his Shotgun Express bandmates including Rod Stewart.

Manning has twins (a son Jonathan and a daughter Georgina) born in 1978 with partner Dean Harris. The children were born two months premature and had to spend the first five months of their lives in incubators which meant Manning could not touch or hold them. Manning said of how she would perform on stage during the day and then sleep in the hospital at night. Still frail as toddlers, they continued to suffer from severe health issues, including from whooping cough which made their immune systems collapse. By this time, Manning had separated from Harris and doctors advised her that a warmer climate would help the twins' health, so Manning moved to Manly, Australia where she met Barry Crocker, who has been her partner since 1990.

In a 2012 Radio Times interview, Manning said she had returned to London three years earlier, although there was no mention of any break-up in their relationship, and she referred to Crocker as her "current partner" in a 2017 interview with the Daily Express:

Filmography

Film

Television

Video games

Music videos

Theatre
(incomplete)
1973: Union Jack (and Bonzo) – Rosie Makron – Edinburgh Fringe Festival, Edinburgh
1973–1975: Why Not Stay for Breakfast? – Louise Hamilton – Apollo Theatre, West End, London
1975–1976:There's a Girl in My Soup – Marion – UK Tour
1975: French Without Tears – Diana Lake – Liverpool Playhouse, Liverpool
1975: The Peter Pan Man – 
1976: So Who Needs Men? – Marsha – London Tour
1977: Natural Gas – UK Tour
1977: Hamlet – Ophelia –
1977: The Real Inspector Hound –
1977: Rosencrantz and Guildenstern Are Dead – 
1977–1978: Doctor in the House – Vera – UK Tour
1978: See How They Run – Penelope Toop
1978: The Monkey Walk – Myra – The Alexandra, Birmingham
1978: Bedroom Farce - Rhodesia Tour
1979: Odd Man In – Jane – The Alexandra, Birmingham
1979: Duet For Three – Pam – Dolphin and Anchor Studio Theatre, Chichester
1979–1980: The Gentle Hook – Stacey Harrison – UK Tour
1980: V E Night –
1981: Thark – Cherry Buck – UK Tour 
1983: Run for Your Wife – Mary Smith – The Playhouse, Adelaide, Australia
1983: Otherwise Engaged – Davina Saunders – Regal Theatre, Subiaco, Australia 
1984: The Odd Couple – Cecily – Her Majesty's Theatre, Melbourne, Australia
1985: Run for Your Wife – Mary Smith – The Playhouse, Adelaide, Australia
1986: Otherwise Engaged – Davina Saunders – Marian Street Theatre, Killara, Australia 
1987–1988: Run for Your Wife – Mary Smith – Criterion Theatre, West End, London
1988: Mother's Day – Barbara – Australia
1989–1990: Educating Rita  – Rita – Australia Tour
1990: How the Other Half Loves – Queensland Tour, Australia 
1990: Blithe Spirit – Elvira – Australia Tour
1990: Blithe Spirit – Elvira – Sydney Opera House, Sydney, Australia
1991: Educating Rita  – Rita – Sydney Opera House, Sydney, Australia
1991: Educating Rita  – Rita – Australia Tour
1993: Hot Taps – Marjorie – Riverside Theatres, Parramatta, Australia
1993: The Removalists – Lennox Theatre, Parramatta, Australia
1994: Don't Dress for Dinner – Suzette – Australia
1997: Gone to Bali – Australia
1998: Noises Off – Dotty – Australia Tour
2000: Later than Spring – Olivia – Marian Street Theatre, Killara, Australia 
2002: The Slippery Slope – Judith Wright Centre of Contemporary Arts, Fortitude Valley, Queensland, Australia
2002: It Runs in the Family – Jane Tate – Twelfth Night Theatre, Bowen Hills, Brisbane, Australia
2007: 'Allo 'Allo! – Yvette Carte-Blanche – Twelfth Night Theatre, Bowen Hills, Brisbane, Australia
2009: Me and Jezebel – Bette Davis/All parts – Australia Tour then UK Tour
2011–2012: Death by Fatal Murder – Blodwyn Morgan – UK Tour
2012: You're Only Young Twice – Rose – UK Tour
2013: A Murder is Announced – Letitia Blacklock – UK Tour
2013: Murder in Play – Christa D'amato – Grand Theatre, Wolverhampton
2013: Keeping up with the Joans – Kitty – Greenwich Theatre, London
2014: Keeping up with the Joans – Kitty – Edinburgh Fringe Festival, Edinburgh
2015: Nobody's Business – Sybil – King's Head Theatre, London

As director
2003: Eureka – Queensland Tour, Australia

References

External links
 
 
 
 
 

1946 births
Living people
English film actresses
English stage actresses
English television actresses
English expatriates in Australia
Naturalised citizens of Australia
20th-century English actresses
21st-century English actresses
Alumni of the Webber Douglas Academy of Dramatic Art
Actors from Guildford